The Anti-Socialist Laws or Socialist Laws (officially , approximately "Law against the public danger of Social Democratic endeavours") were a series of acts of the parliament of the German Empire, the first of which was passed on 19 October 1878 by the Reichstag lasting until 31 March 1881 and extended four times (May 1880, May 1884, April 1886 and February 1888).

The legislation gained widespread support after two failed attempts to assassinate Kaiser Wilhelm I of Germany by the radicals Max Hödel and Karl Nobiling. The laws were designed by Chancellor Otto von Bismarck with the goal of reversing the growing strength of the Social Democratic Party (SPD, named SAP at the time) which was blamed for inspiring the assassins. However, the laws caused the socialist movement to strengthen at times. This resulted in Bismarck dropping the laws and changing his coalition, eventually becoming an ally of his former enemies the Catholic Centre Party which appealed to Catholic workers who opposed socialism.

Background 
The Socialist Workers' Party of Germany (SAPD), later renamed the Social Democratic Party of Germany (SPD), was formed with the merger General German Workers' Association founded in 1863 in Leipzig, on the initiative of Ferdinand Lassalle, and the Social Democratic Workers' Party of Germany founded in 1869 in Eisenach by Wilhelm Liebknecht and August Bebel.

The terms "socialism" and "social democracy" at that time were understood as synonyms. They were formed under the influence of the philosophical, political and economic theories of Karl Marx and Friedrich Engels, who were then living in exile in London. According to the revolutionary theory, the "Social Democratic Party of Germany" claimed to represent the political interests of the labor movement and the working-class. The Social Democrats sought to improve the social position of the working class and ultimately eliminate the existing "non-democratic" structures of government. 
August Bebel and Wilhelm Liebknecht protested against the Franco-Prussian War of 1870 and expressed solidarity with the revolutionary Paris Commune in 1871, for which they were sentenced in 1872 by the Leipzig Court to two years in prison in a high treason case.

Reich Chancellor of Germany Otto von Bismarck, a conservative, an adherent of monarchical principles of government, with a restrained or even hostile attitude to democratic ideas and a fear of the outbreak of a socialist revolution similar to the one that created the Paris Commune, from the very beginning considered the Socialist Workers' Party as an "enemy of the Reich" and even before the adoption of the law, he took repressive measures against social democracy and the nascent trade union movement.

In 1878 two unsuccessful assassinations were carried out on Kaiser Wilhelm I: on May 11 by Max Hödel and on June 2nd by Karl Eduard Nobiling. Bismarck took these attacks as an opportunity to use the Socialist Law to take more rigorous and effective action against the social democracy, which was becoming increasingly influential in the workforce. Although Hödel had been expelled from the SAP shortly before his attack and Nobiling's attack was guided by personal delusions, Bismarck had the narrative spread that the attacks could be traced back to the Social Democrats. A connection between the attacks and social democracy that goes beyond the two individual perpetrators was and has still not been demonstrated.

Laws 
Back in May 1878, after the first attempt on the Kaiser's life, Bismarck presented a draft "Law on the Prevention of Social Democratic Excesses", which, however, was rejected by the Reichstag by an overwhelming majority.

In the second assassination attempt on June 2, 1878, the Kaiser was seriously wounded. Bismarck used the ensuing public outrage to dissolve the Reichstag and campaign against the Social Democrats, whom he accused of ideologically aiding criminals. In the newly elected Reichstag, a toughened draft of the "Law on Socialists" was presented, over which disputes arose between individual parliamentary groups. On October 19, 1878, supporters of the toughened bill won: 221 votes against 149.

On October 21, the Law was approved by the Bundesrat, then signed by Kaiser Wilhelm I, and on October 22, 1878, it was promulgated and entered into force. It operated until September 30, 1890. The term of the Law was initially limited to 2.5 years, and then extended four times (May 31, 1880, May 28, 1884, April 20, 1886, and March 18, 1888).

Although the law did not ban the SPD directly, it aimed to cripple the organization through various means. The banning of any group or meeting of whose aims were to spread social-democratic principles, the outlawing of trade unions and the closing of 45 newspapers are examples of suppression. The party circumvented these measures by having its candidates run as ostensible independents, relocating publications outside of Germany and spreading Social Democratic views as verbatim publications of Reichstag speeches which were privileged speech with regard to censorship.

The law also banned the display of emblems of the Social Democratic Party. To circumvent the law, Social Democrats wore red bits of ribbons in their buttonholes. However, these actions led to arrest and jail sentences. Subsequently, red rosebuds were substituted by the Social Democrats. These actions also led to arrest and jail sentences. The judge ruled that in general everyone has a right to wear any flower as suits their taste, but it becomes a party emblem when socialists as a group wear red rosebuds. In a final display of protest against this clause of the anti-socialist laws, female socialists began wearing red flannel petticoats. When female socialists wanted to show a sign of solidarity, they would lift their outer-skirts. Female socialists would display in protest their red petticoats to the police, who were constrained by social norms of decency from enforcing the prohibition against this new sign of socialist solidarity.

Repeal of the law and aftermath 

Despite the government's attempts to weaken the SPD, the party continued to grow in popularity. The failure by Bismarck of a bill of permanent validity that was otherwise tightened as well as the strengthening of the social democracy in the Reichstag elections on February 20, 1890 played a decisive role in the overthrow of Bismarck and his dismissal by Kaiser Wilhelm II, who was enthroned in 1888. As early as 1888, Bismarck had failed with a bill according to which social democrats could formally have been expatriated as Germans. The cause of the failure was not least that the members of the SAP exposed the unscrupulous practices of the political police in the Reichstag. On January 25, 1890, the further extension of the law failed and it was officially repealed.

Overall, social democracy emerged stronger from the conflict. In the first Reichstag elections after the end of the Socialist Act on June 15, 1893, the Social Democratic Party received more votes than ever before (23.4%). Socialists therefore celebrated these elections to the Reichstag as a "great victory for freedom and peace".

Timeline 
 11 May 1878: two shots fired at Wilhelm I by Max Hödel.
 17 May 1878: the Prussian government demands the Bundesrat ban the SPD. In the Reichstag, only conservatives supported the bill.
 2 June 1878: Wilhelm I is shot by Karl Nobiling.
 11 June 1878: the Reichstag dissolved.
 30 July 1878: in new elections, socialists lose three of their 12 seats. The Anti-Socialist bill is passed by the two conservative parties and the National Liberals.
 19 October 1878: the bill passed by 221 to 149. The Social Democrats voluntarily dissolved the party.
 18 November 1878: a minor state of siege is declared in Berlin, with 67 Social Democrats expelled.
 21–23 August 1880: the Wyden party congress sees the expulsion of Johann Most and Wilhelm Hasselmann for anarchism by the SPD's moderate wing.
 28 October 1880: a minor state of siege is declared in Hamburg.
 4 April 1881: the Social Democrats back accident insurance but demand several amendments.
 June 1881: a minor state of siege is declared in Leipzig, with local SPD organization destroyed.
 8 September 1881: the moderate socialist Louis Viereck begs Friedrich Engels to tone down the radicalism of the party newspaper Sozialdemocrat
 19–21 August 1882: a secret conference in Zürich is organized by Bebel, partly healing the division between moderates and radicals.
 1883: the Anti-Socialist Laws partly are relaxed, strengthening the SPD.
 March 1883: a secret Copenhagen Congress condemns State Socialism.
 13 January 1885: the Frankfurt police chief Rumpf is stabbed to death by the young anarchist Julius Lieske.
 2 April 1886: the Reichstag votes 173 to 146 to renew the Anti-Socialist Laws.
 11 April 1886: the Prussian interior minister Puttkaner issues the strike decree which gives the police the power to use the Anti-Socialist Laws against strikers and expel their leaders.
 11 May 1886: political meetings in Berlin now need police permission 48 hours before.
 20 May 1886: a minor state of siege is declared in Spremberg.
 31 July 1886: nine Social Democratic leaders are convicted at the Saxon state court for joining an illegal organization.
 16 December 1886: a minor state of siege in is declared Frankfurt am Main.
 15 February 1887: a minor state of siege is declared in Stettin.
 2–6 October 1887: the St. Gall party congress results in Bebel defeating his opponents.
 Fall 1887: Bismarck fails to get the Social Democratic leaders expelled from Germany.
 2 May 1889: a coal miners strike in the Rühr is not supported by the SPD
 14–20 July 1889: the Second International is founded in Paris.
 25 January 1890: the Reichstag refuses to renew the Anti-Socialist Laws.
 20 February 1890: the Social Democrats win 19.75% of the vote.
 18 March 1890: Bismarck resigns.

Prominent Social Democratic members of the Reichstag during the period

See also 
 Anti-terrorism legislation
 Lois scélérates

References

Further reading 
 Bonnell, Andrew G. "Socialism and Republicanism in imperial Germany." Australian Journal of Politics & History 42.2 (1996): 192–202.
 Hall, Alex. "The War of Words: Anti-socialist Offensives and Counter-propaganda in Wilhelmine Germany 1890-1914." Journal of Contemporary History 11.2 (1976): 11–42. online.
 Lidtke, Vernon L. The Outlawed Party: Social Democracy in Germany, 1878-1890. Princeton, NJ: Princeton University Press, 1966. online free to borrow.
 Lidtke, Vernon L. "German social democracy and German state socialism, 1876–1884." International Review of Social History 9.2 (1964): 202–225. online.

Political repression in Germany
Social Democratic Party of Germany
Politics of the German Empire
19th century in law
1878 in Germany
1879 in Germany
1880 in Germany
1881 in Germany
1870s in Germany